Michael Richard Beard (born July 21, 1950 - November 6, 2022) was an American former professional baseball player, a left-handed pitcher who appeared in 74 games — 72 in relief — in the Major Leagues between  and  for the Atlanta Braves. Beard was drafted by the Braves in the first round (18th overall) of the secondary phase of the 1971 Major League Baseball Draft after pitching for the University of Texas at Austin.

Recalled from the Triple-A Richmond Braves in May, Beard appeared in 34 games and compiled a perfect 4–0 win–loss record as a relief pitcher. He also made his only two Major League starts that September against the San Diego Padres and San Francisco Giants. He allowed seven hits and five earned runs in an even nine innings pitched as a starter, but did not earn a decision.

His professional career ended after the 1977 season, his seventh in the game. During his Major League career, he allowed 128 hits and 45 bases on balls, with 43 strikeouts, in 118 innings pitched.

References

External links

1950 births
Living people
Atlanta Braves players
Baseball players from Arkansas
Little Rock Central High School alumni
Major League Baseball pitchers
New Orleans Pelicans (baseball) players
Richmond Braves players
Savannah Braves players
Texas Longhorns baseball players
Sportspeople from Little Rock, Arkansas